The 1807 Delaware gubernatorial election was held on October 6, 1807.

Incumbent Federalist Governor Nathaniel Mitchell was not eligible for re-election under the Delaware Constitution of 1792. 

Federalist nominee George Truitt defeated Democratic-Republican nominee Joseph Haslet with 51.94% of the vote.

General election

Results

References

Bibliography
 
 
 

1807
Delaware
Gubernatorial